Hombleux is a commune in the Somme department in Hauts-de-France in northern France. On 1 January 2019, the former commune Grécourt was merged into Hombleux.

Geography

Population

See also
Communes of the Somme department

References

Communes of Somme (department)

Communes nouvelles of Somme